TechnipFMC plc is a French-American, UK-domiciled global oil and gas company that provides complete project life cycle services for the energy industry. It was ranked 23rd among world's Top 225 International Design Firms in the year 2017 by Engineering News-Record. The company was formed by the merger of FMC Technologies of the United States and Technip of France that was announced in 2016 and completed in 2017. TechnipFMC acts in three distinct segments: subsea, offshore/onshore, and surface projects. These projects include offshore oil and gas exploration and extraction platforms, rigs, crude oil refinery, petrochemical plants such as Ethylene, Hydrogen, SynGas plants, Naptha, Benzene etc. plastics & rubber industry, fertiliser plant, onshore as well as floating LNG plants. The company is legally domiciled in the UK, and has major operations in Houston and Paris where its predecessor companies were headquartered. It has about 23,000 employees from 126 nationalities and operates in 48 countries. TechnipFMC stock is listed on the NYSE and Euronext Paris exchange, and is a component of the CAC Next 20 and the Dow Jones Sustainability Index. The French government owns a 4 percent stake in the company.

History 
TechnipFMC was formed through the merger of FMC Technologies Inc. and French oil-services Technip SA. On January 17, 2017, TechnipFMC announced that it is operating as a unified company after completion of the merger, which created a significant new player in an energy industry wracked by a nearly two-year slump in crude prices. The company has three headquarters in Houston, Paris, and London. The CEO is Doug Pferdehirt and the executive chairman is Thierry Pilenko.
TechnipFMC also provides consulting and technology business through its two subsidiaries, PT and Genesis.
Through 2016-2017 the TechnipFMC fleet expanded with the addition of four pipe-laying vessels (PLSVs) constructed under the DOF-Technip partnership, two foreign (Skandi Açu and Skandi Buzios) and two Brazilian (Skandi Olinda and Skandi Recife). Another ship who entered operations was the Deep Explorer, one of the most advanced diving support vessels (DSV) in the world.

In August 2019, Doug Pferdehirt announced that TechnipFMC will be split into two independent engineering companies. The separation is expected to be completed by the end of the first semester 2020. The former Technip entity, without the subsea business, was renamed Technip Energies.

On March 15, 2020, the group announced the suspension of the spin-off due to market conditions in the context of the COVID-19 pandemic.

Organization 
Technip was certified as one of the first five companies in the world as a Global Top Employer 2015 which recognizes first-class employee offerings globally and equally, so TechnipFMC holds those credentials.

Recent Projects 
Yamal LNG, Russia
Prelude FLNG, Australia
Statoil Trestakk Oil Field Development, Norway
Coral South FLNG Project, Offshore Mozambique
Sulphate Reduction Plant, Abu Dhabi, UAE
Liza Deep Water Project, Guyana
Kaikias Deep Water Project, Gulf of Mexico
Sankofa Field Development, Ghana
Riserless light Well Intervention services, Ichthys Field, Australia
Integrated Development of Vashishta (VA) & S1 fields, Andhra Pradesh, India
Slurry Oil Filtration System for Fluid Catalytic Cracking Unit

Types of Projects 
TechnipFMC has capability to execute following types of projects:
 Front end consulting for prospects
 Basic Engineering Packages 
 Detailed Engineering
 Engineering, Procurement
 Engineering, Procurement & Construction
 Engineering, Procurement & Construction Management
 Project Management Consultancy

Fleet of Vessels 
TechnipFMC owns and operates 21 vessels and 4 are under construction. These large vessels are used for installation of subsea oil extraction systems on the seabed. They are of four categories:

1. Flexible-lay & Construction Vessels
Deep Orient
Skandi Africa
North Sea Atlantic
Deep Star

2. Diving & multi support Vessels
Deep Arctic
Deep Explorer
Deep Discoverer

3. Rigid S-Lay & heavy lift Vessels
Global 1200

4. Rigid Reel-lay & J-Lay Vessels
Apache II
Deep Blue
Deep Energy

Manufacturing Plants 
TechnipFMC designs and manufactures Umbilical cable and flexible pipes. It has flexible pipe manufacturing plants in France, Brazil and Malaysia. It operates umbilical production facilities in UK, United States, Angola, Singapore, Brazil and Malaysia. TechnipFMC has started Modular Manufacturing Yard at Dahej in Gujarat state of India in 2017.

Operating Centres 
TechnipFMC has centres in various cities of the world.

Africa

Algeria
Angola
Cameroon
Congo
Egypt
Gabon
Ghana
Mozambique
Nigeria
Tunisia

Asia, Australia and Middle East

Azerbaijan
Australia
China
India
Indonesia
Iraq
Kazakhstan
Kuwait
Malaysia
Oman
Pakistan
Qatar
Russia
Saudi Arabia
Singapore
Thailand
United Arab Emirates
Vietnam

Europe
Bulgaria
Finland
France
Germany
Greece
Italy
Netherlands
Norway
Poland
Portugal
Spain
United Kingdom

North America
Canada
Mexico
United States

South America
Argentina
Brazil
Colombia
Venezuela

Controversies 

In 2010, the company's Paris-based predecessor (Technip) was fined $240 million for paying bribes to win contracts to build a liquefied-natural-gas plant in Nigeria.

In June 2019, TechnipFMC agreed to pay around US$300 Million to resolve allegations it bribed government officials in Iraq (FMC) and Brazil, including at the country's state-controlled oil-and-gas company Petróleo Brasileiro S.A., also known as Petrobras.

See also 
List of oilfield service companies

References

External links 
Official website

Companies based in the City of London
Oilfield services companies
Companies listed on Euronext Paris
Energy companies established in 2017
Government-owned companies of France
Engineering companies of the United Kingdom
Construction and civil engineering companies of the United Kingdom
Construction and civil engineering companies established in 2017
Companies listed on the New York Stock Exchange